Padre Bancalari (fl. 19th century) was professor of natural philosophy at the University of Genoa.  In 1847, he discovered that flames were diamagnetic by showing that there were repulsed by a strong magnetic field.

References

19th-century Italian physicists
Academic staff of the University of Genoa